William Ray Collins Jr. (September 21, 1961 – March 6, 1984) was an undefeated American professional boxer who competed from 1981 to 1983. His career was cut short after his final fight when he sustained serious injuries against Luis Resto in their ten-round bout. Aided by his trainer Panama Lewis, Resto used illegal, tampered gloves with an ounce of the gloves' cushioning removed, along with hand wraps which had been soaked in plaster of Paris.

Professional career
Billy Collins was born to a working-class Irish family in Antioch, Tennessee. His father (whose mother was native American) was a former welterweight professional boxer who had once fought world champion Curtis Cokes. He trained his son to follow in his footsteps since before kindergarten. Also a welterweight, Collins won his first 14 fights as a professional, among them a decision over future world title challenger Harold Brazier.

Final fight against Luis Resto
Collins was matched against Puerto Rican journeyman Luis Resto at Madison Square Garden in New York on June 16, 1983, on the undercard of the Roberto Durán vs. Davey Moore light middleweight title fight. Collins entered the fight as a betting favorite but took a heavy beating and lost by a unanimous decision.

At the end of the fight, Collins' father and trainer, Billy Sr., noticed that Resto's gloves felt thinner than normal and demanded that they be impounded. A subsequent investigation by the New York State Boxing Commission concluded that Resto's trainer, Panama Lewis, had removed an ounce of padding from each glove. It made Resto's punches harder and more damaging to Collins. The fight result was changed to a no contest.

Lewis' New York boxing license was permanently revoked, effectively banning him from any official role in American boxing for life. Resto was suspended indefinitely and never fought again. In 1986, Lewis and Resto were tried and convicted of assault, conspiracy, and criminal possession of a deadly weapon (Resto's plaster of paris wraps); prosecutors felt that Lewis' actions made the fight an illegal assault on Collins. Both served 2 years in prison.

Injuries and auto accident
In the Resto fight, Collins' eyes were swollen shut. He suffered a torn iris and permanently blurred vision, which left him unable to box again.

On March 6, 1984, Collins was killed when the car in which he and his best friend were driving crashed into a culvert near his home in Antioch, Tennessee, a suburb of Nashville. The autopsy showed he died a short time later at the scene of the accident. Many commentators, as well as Collins' family, believe that the loss of his livelihood broke him emotionally and physically.

Legal action
In July 1983, Collins and his family sued Lewis, Resto, fight promoter Top Rank Boxing, the inspectors, the bout's referee and Everlast (the manufacturer of Resto's gloves) for gross negligence and loss of income.  The suit against Everlast was dismissed by the Federal Court which found that there was no liability since the gloves had been tampered with after they were delivered by Everlast. Collins, Sr. and Collins' widow Andrea then sued the New York State Boxing Commission for failing to protect Collins.  The commission argued that the term "inspection" was so broad that there was no way to determine whether the fight's inspectors could have done more than they did.  It also claimed that Top Rank actually hired the inspectors and bore more responsibility for their behavior.  A court ruled in favor of the commission, and the court also noted that Collins' death ended any potential future damages.  However, Collins' widow, now known as Andrea Collins-Nile, attempted to reopen the suit. The request was denied.  The state subsequently changed its rules to prevent a repeat of what happened to Collins. The Collins family never saw any compensation.

Further revelations by Resto
In 2007, Resto made a tearful apology to Collins-Nile for his role in the scheme unexpectedly during the making of a Showtime documentary about the fight.  He also admitted that his hand wraps had been soaked in plaster of Paris before the fight. This caused them to harden into plaster casts like those used to set broken bones.  The hand wraps were never confiscated and did not figure into the official investigation of the tampering incident.  However, the combined effect of the plaster casts and unpadded gloves meant that Resto was effectively striking Collins with rocks.  At a 2008 press conference, Resto not only admitted to knowing that Lewis had tampered with the gloves, but had done so at least twice before. The 1983 incident and subsequent aftermath is covered in the 2008 Showtime documentary Assault in the Ring.

Professional boxing record

References

External links

Luis Resto vs. Billy Collins Jr. (1983) – A Retrospective Ring Report at eastsideboxing.com (archived)
Collins vs. Resto (full fight) on YouTube

1961 births
1984 suicides
Light-middleweight boxers
American male boxers
American people of Irish descent
Road incident deaths in Tennessee
People from Antioch, Tennessee